Juan de Lima Serqueira (c. 1655-1726) was a Spanish Baroque composer of tonos humanos.

References

Spanish Baroque composers
1655 births
1726 deaths
Spanish male classical composers
18th-century classical composers
18th-century male musicians